Mungrisdale is a civil parish in the Eden District, Cumbria, England.  It contains 47 listed buildings that are recorded in the National Heritage List for England.  Of these, three are listed at Grade II*, the middle of the three grades, and the others are at Grade II, the lowest grade.  The parish is in the Lake District National Park, and is sparsely populated, consisting mainly of countryside, moorland and fells.   There are small settlements at Mungrisdale, Mosedale, Haltcliff Bridge, Southerfell, Berrier, Hutton Moor End, Hutton Roof, Low Mill, and Swineside.  Most of the listed buildings are houses, farmhouses and farm buildings, the other listed buildings including a Friends' meeting house, bridges, a church, a former saw mill, a former school, eight boundary stones, and a telephone kiosk.


Key

Buildings

References

Citations

Sources

Lists of listed buildings in Cumbria